Santiago (Spanish meaning Saint James) is a municipality of the western part of the state of Rio Grande do Sul, Brazil. It is the capital of the microregion of Santiago. Its elevation is 409 m. It is located 450 km west of the state capital of Porto Alegre and northeast of Alegrete. The nickname of the city is "The Land of the Poets".

Santiago Airport serves the city.

Neighboring municipalities
Os Pinguins de Madagascar
A Lenda de Korra
Brichos
Zica e os Camaleões
Henry Danger
The Thundermans
O Segredo dos Animais
True Jackson
Fanboy & Chum Chum

History

In about 1860, settlement of the region began.  The colony was first founded by 350 Germans, 14 Belgians, 5 French persons and 4 Swiss persons.  Colonel José Maria Pereira de Campos created and organized the colony of Ijuí and brought Europeans to the area.  The Italians arrived in the 1880s, as the century passed, with the establishment of the colony of Jaguari, the localities of Sanga da Areia and Ernesto Alves.  In 1834, Arsene Isabelle, a French diplomat, in ways between the area, refers to a locality of Boqueirão de Santiago, its existence of three to four ranches.  The Germans and the Italians form a large influx of European immigration, a mixture with other nationalities which saw Belgians, Swiss, Polish and French immigration.  In synthesis, the colonies were established in 1860 and had diverse types of humans in the municipality of Santiago, with no other municipalities, the population became predominantly European descent.

Education

Santiago has a campus of the Universidade Regional Integrada do Alto Uruguai e das Missões

Communications

Radio
Rádio Nova 99 FM Website, Live broadcast
Verdes Pampas FM Website, Live broadcast
Rádio Santiago AM Website

Portal de Internet e Notícias
Portal Terra dos Poetas

Personalities 
 Luiz Carlos Prates: Radio-journalist and psychologist

References

External links
Official Website

Universidade Regional Integrada - Campus Santiago-RS

Municipalities in Rio Grande do Sul